Naduvannur is a Census town   in Kozhikode district in the state of Kerala, India and a part of Kozhikode Urban Agglomeration.
The name Naduvannur denotes that it was the centre of the territory of Kurumbranad. 'Nadu' means centre and ur(oor) means place.

Naduvannur is about 28 km away from Kozhikode city. Kozhikode–Kuttiyadi SH passes through here. Nearby towns are Koyilandy, Balussery and Perambra.

Education
Govt. higher secondary school Naduvannur, Malabar ITI Naduvannur, Naduvannur higher secondary school Vakayad, Kavumthara AUP School, Govt.Welfare LP school Kavil, Karuvannur GUP school, Naduvannur south AMUP school, Elankamal AMLPS, GMLPS Naduvannur, Noorul Huda public school Naduvannur, Mannankave ALPS, Virtue public school, Mahathma Vidya Nikethan public school, Little Flower school Naduvannur and Markazuddunnurain are the major educational institutions.

Demographics
, Naduvannur had a population of 24,648 with 12,004 males and 12,644 females.

Transportation
Naduvannur village connects to other parts of India through Kozhikode and Koyilandy towns. The nearest airport is Kozhikode. The nearest railway station is at Koyiandy. State Highway 38 passes through Naduvannur which starts from Puthiyangadi in Kozhikode and ends in Chovva in Kannur.

See also
 Kottur
 Moodadi
 Chengottukavu
 Arikkulam
 Thikkodi
 Chemancheri
 Kappad
 Atholi
 Ulliyeri
 Cheekilode
 Nochad
 Koyilandy

References

Koyilandy area